Samuel Ato Ghansah (born 31 March 1993 ) is a Ghanaian football midfielder.

Career
He played youth football for Ghanaian clubs Inter Allies Football Club 2009–2010, Kessben FC 2010-2011 and Sekondi Eleven Wise.
Samuel played 2010–2011 with Tudu Mighty Jets FC. His first senior goal at Tudu Mighty Jets FC came on 12 January 2011 when he scored the equalizer in a 2–1 home win over B.A. Stars in the 17th Week of Glo Premier League.
He moved to Medeama SC in 2011/12 season, At the end of his first season he got transferred on loan to Cape Coast base team Ebusua Dwarfs.He then moved to Dedebit F.C.

EEPCO

On 13 August 2014, he joined Ethiopian side EEPCO on a free transfer. In 2016/2017 he moved to Jimma Ketema, Avenues United and AS Kasserine 2017–2018.

References

External links
Tudu Mighty Jets Profile at ZeroZero.pt
https://www.africanewshub.com/news/1798228-exclusive-ethiopian-side-eepcoo-sign-former-mighty-jets-midfielder-samuel-ato-ghansah
http://vibeghana.com/2011/01/09/rtu-snap-33-years-losing-streak-with-win-over-hearts/
https://news.ghanamma.com/2011/01/10/kotoko-silence-all-stars-to-mark-revival/
https://ghanafoot.wordpress.com/2011/01/12/

Living people
Ghanaian footballers
Association football midfielders
1993 births
Footballers from Accra
Tudu Mighty Jets FC players